The Amblycipitidae are a family of catfishes, commonly known as torrent catfishes. It includes three genera, Amblyceps, Liobagrus, and Xiurenbagrus, and about 36 species.

Taxonomy
The family Amblycipitidae is a monophyletic group containing four monophyletic genera, Amblyceps, Liobagrus, Nahangbagrus and Xiurenbagrus. It is the most basal sisoroid family and is sister to a clade formed by the remaining families. The genera Amblyceps and Liobagrus are a sister group pair that is, in turn, sister to Xiurenbagrus.

Distribution and habitat
These kinds of fishes can be found in swift freshwater streams in southern and eastern Asia, including Pakistan across northern India to Malaysia, China, Korea, and Japan. Amblyceps are mainly distributed in India and the Malay Peninsula. Liobagrus fishes are distributed in the Yangtze River basin, Taiwan, Japan, and the Korea Peninsula. The species of the genus Xiurenbagrus are only distributed in the Pearl River basin.

Description
Fish of this family have dorsal fins covered by skin. An adipose fin is also present, and is fused with the caudal fin in some species. The dorsal fin base is short and the dorsal fin spine is weak. The anal fin base is short. There are six pairs of barbels. The lateral line is poorly developed or absent. Both Amblyceps and Liobagrus species grow to about  SL.

Liobagrus is more stoutly built than Amblyceps, the nostrils are close together in Amblyceps and distinctly apart in Liobagrus, and Amblyceps species have a cup-like flap above the pectoral fins that is absent in Liobagrus. Also, Amblyceps has double-folded lips and fin margins pigmented differently from the background colour, while Liobagrus has single-folded lips and fin margins paler than the background colour.

References

 
Fish of Asia
Catfish families
Taxa named by Francis Day